The Belarusian Social Democratic Assembly (BSDH;), commonly shortened to "Hramada" or "The Assembly", is a Belarusian social-democratic political party. Businessman Siarhiej Čeračań has been the leader of the party since October 2018.

Leadership 
The previous head of the party from 1998 to 2018 was Stanislav Shushkevich, who has the distinction of having been the first head of state of the Republic of Belarus after its independence from the Soviet Union, between 1991 and 1994. After running unsuccessfully for president in the 1994 election, he did not participate in politics again until helping to form the party in 1998. In 2004 he was not allowed to register as a candidate and so in the 2010 presidential election he was a supporter of candidate Andrei Sannikov.

History 
 1991 — Creation of the Belarusian Social Democratic Assembly, with Aleh Trusaŭ as a chairman.
 1992 — Aleh Trusaǔ becomes party chairman.
 1996 — Association with Social Democratic Party of Popular Accord, formation of the Belarusian Social Democratic Party (People's Assembly). 
 1998 — Reconstruction of the Belarusian Social Democratic Assembly, Stanisłaŭ Šuškievič becomes chairman.
 2016 — The party boycotts the 2016 Belarusian parliamentary elections.
 2018 — Siarhiej Čeračań becomes party chairman.

Electoral history

Presidential elections

Legislative elections

See also 
 Belarusian Socialist Assembly

References

External links

1991 establishments in Belarus
Political parties established in 1991
Political parties in Belarus
Pro-European political parties in Belarus
Social democratic parties in Belarus